Boston is an unincorporated community in the Boston Mountains of southeastern Madison County, Arkansas, United States. The community is located on Arkansas Highway 16 between Pettigrew to the southwest and Red Star to the northeast. The location is at the headwaters of four streams: Kings River to the northeast, War Eagle Creek to the northwest, the White River to the east and southwest and Little Mulberry Creek (a tributary to the Mulberry River) to the southeast.

The Boston Chapel and cemetery lie about three-quarters of a mile to the south of Boston along a county road. The Boston Lookout Tower is about two miles south of Boston along the same county road.

References

Unincorporated communities in Madison County, Arkansas
Unincorporated communities in Arkansas